Miss Aquitaine is a French beauty pageant which selects a representative for the Miss France national competition from the region of Aquitaine. Women representing the region under various different titles have competed at Miss France since 1920, although the Miss Aquitaine title was not used regularly until 1985.

The current Miss Aquitaine is Orianne Galvez-Soto, who was crowned Miss Aquitaine 2022 on 2 October 2022. Seven women from Aquitaine have been crowned Miss France:
Agnès Souret, who was crowned Miss France 1920
Jeanne Juillia, who was crowned Miss France 1931, competing as Miss Gascony
Josiane Pouy, who was crowned Miss France 1952, competing as Miss Côte d'Argent
Frédérique Leroy, who was crowned Miss France 1983, competing as Miss Bordeaux, following the dethroning of the original winner
Peggy Zlotkowski, who was crowned Miss France 1989
Gaëlle Voiry, who was crowned Miss France 1990
Mélody Vilbert, who was crowned Miss France 1995

Results summary
Miss France: Agnès Souret (1919); Jeanne Juillia (1930; Miss Gascony); Josiane Pouy (1951; Miss Côte d'Argent); Peggy Zlotkowski (1988); Gaëlle Voiry (1989); Mélody Vilbert (1994)
1st Runner-Up: Christine Schmidt (1972; Miss Arcachon); Martine Calzavara (1974; Miss Gascony); Frédérique Leroy (1982; Miss Bordeaux; later Miss France)
2nd Runner-Up: Marie-Thérèse Thiel (1970; Miss Gascony); Christine Schmidt (1971; Miss Arcachon); Martine Calzavara (1973; Miss Lot-et-Garonne); Bénédicte Delmas (1991; Miss Côte Basque)
3rd Runner-Up: Colette Dezanet (1952; Miss Côte d'Argent); Sylvie Tardy (1989; Miss Périgord); Malaurie Eugénie (2014)
4th Runner-Up: Pierrette Descrambes (1960; Miss Guyenne); Thérèse Trady (1961); Josiane Klaasen (1965; Miss Bordeaux); Chantal Braham (1977; Miss Médoc); Maylis Ondicola (1996); Élodie Pleumeckers (2002); Lyse Ruchat (2006)
5th Runner-Up: Céline Reiter (2001); Gennifer Demey (2015); Cassandra Jullia (2017); Ambre Andrieu (2021)
6th Runner-Up: Christiane Campello (1970); Anne-Sophie Vigno (1996; Miss Béarn)
Top 12/Top 15: Nathalie Eyogo (1986); Emmanuelle Mérinot (1990); Renée-Noëlle Chassagne (1992; Miss Périgord); Axelle Bonnemaison (2016); Carla Bonesso (2018); Justine Delmas (2019); Leïla Veslard (2020); Orianne Galvez-Soto (2022)

Titleholders

Miss Arcachon
In 1964 and the 1970s, the department of Gironde competed separately under the title Miss Arcachon.

Miss Armagnac
In 1970, the departments of Gers and Landes competed separately under the titles Miss Armagnac. Women from Gers were eligible to compete, due to the department's historical ties to Armagnac, despite being located in Midi-Pyrénées.

Miss Béarn
In 1996, 2003, 2004, and 2009, the departments of Landes and Pyrénées-Atlantiques competed separately under the titles Miss Béarn (1996), Miss Bigorre-Béarn (2003; 2004), and Miss Béarn-Gascogne (2009). In 2003 and 2004, women from Hautes-Pyrénées were also eligible to compete, due to the department's historical ties to Bigorre, despite being located in Midi-Pyrénées.

Miss Bordeaux
From the 1960s to 1980s, the department of Gironde competed separately under the title Miss Bordeaux. In 1977 and 1978, the title was called Miss Grand-Bordeaux.

Miss Côte Basque
From the 1960s to 1990s, the department of Pyrénées-Atlantiques competed separately under the title Miss Côte Basque.

Miss Côte d'Argent
In 1951, 1952, and 1976, the departments of Gironde, Landes, and Pyrénées-Atlantiques competed separately under the title Miss Côte d'Argent. In 1979, a titleholder was crowned under the title Miss Côte-Sud-des-Landes.

Miss Entre-Deux-Mers
In 1976, the department of Gironde competed separately under the title Miss Entre-Deux-Mers.

Miss Gascony
In 1930 and from the 1970s to 2000s, Aquitaine and Midi-Pyrénées crowned a representative under the title Miss Gascony, to represent the historic region of Gascony, located between both Aquitaine and Midi-Pyrénées. Representatives crowned Miss Gascony who hailed from Midi-Pyrénées are included in the Miss Midi-Pyrénées article.

Miss Guyenne
In 1960, the departments of Dordogne and Gironde competed separately under the title Miss Guyenne. In 2003 and 2004, the title was known as Miss Aquitaine-Guyenne.

Miss Landes
In 1976, the department of Landes crowned its own representative for Miss France.

Miss Lot-et-Garonne
In 1973, the department of Lot-et-Garonne crowned its own representative for Miss France. In 1952 and 1970, a representative was crowned under the title Miss Agen, while a representative was crowned under the title Miss Roquefort in 1972.

Miss Médoc
In 1976, 1977, 1986, and 1987, the department of Gironde competed separately under the title Miss Médoc.

Miss Monbazillac
In 1976 and 1978, the department of Dordogne competed separately under the title Miss Monbazillac. In 1977, the title was called Miss Monbazillac-Périgord.

Miss Périgord
From the 1970s to 2000s, the department of Dordogne competed separately under the title Miss Périgord. In 1983 and 1984, the title was known as Miss Périgord-Agenais.

Miss Soulac
In 1979, the department of Gironde competed separately under the title Miss Soulac.

Notes

References

External links

Miss France regional pageants
Beauty pageants in France
Women in France